Romulus and Remus is a painting by the Flemish artist Peter Paul Rubens. It is housed in the Pinacoteca Capitolina in Rome, Italy. It depicts the brothers Romulus and Remus being cared for by a wolf. The painting also shows the god of the Tiber river sitting on his urn, a woodpecker that watched over the twins to bring them food, and a shepherd discovering the infants.

Notes

1616 paintings
Paintings depicting Greek myths
Mythological paintings by Peter Paul Rubens
Paintings in the Capitoline Museums
Nude art
Paintings in Rome
Wolves in art
Birds in art
Cultural depictions of Romulus and Remus